Clare Henley married name Clare Halsted (born 18 August 1948) is a retired British international fencer.

Fencing career
She competed in the women's individual and team foil events at the 1972 and 1976 Summer Olympics.

She represented England and won a gold medal in the team foil event, at the 1970 British Commonwealth Games in Edinburgh, Scotland.

Personal life
She married fellow fencing international Nick Halsted in 1972 and their son Laurence Halsted (born 1984) also became an international fencer.

References

1948 births
Living people
British female foil fencers
Olympic fencers of Great Britain
Fencers at the 1972 Summer Olympics
Fencers at the 1976 Summer Olympics
People from Wallingford, Oxfordshire
Commonwealth Games medallists in fencing
Commonwealth Games gold medallists for England
Fencers at the 1970 British Commonwealth Games
Medallists at the 1970 British Commonwealth Games